Anderson County High School is located in Lawrenceburg, Kentucky, United States. The current building was constructed in 1965. The school has long been known for its basketball program, from which many athletes have gone on to college and, in at least one case, into the NBA. For example, alumni basketball player Jimmy Dan Conner went on to set records at the University of Kentucky. In the modern age, the Marching Band has been the most successful competing group at the School. Since 2012, the band finished 3rd in AAAA class three times, was runner up twice and won class AAAA State Championships in 2017 and 2021. The band rose to prominence under director Patrick Brady.

References

External links
 

Schools in Anderson County, Kentucky
Public high schools in Kentucky